Jane Spencer may refer to:

Jane Spencer (journalist), American journalist
Jane Spencer (director), American film director
Jane Spencer, Baroness Churchill (1826–1900), English peeress